Hiett is a surname. Notable people with the surname include:

Jessie Hiett (1874–1962), New Zealand temperance activist
Steve Hiett (1940–2019), English photographer, musician, artist, and graphic designer
Todd Hiett (born 1967), American rancher and politician

See also
 Hyatt (disambiguation)

English-language surnames